Dujon Henriques Sterling (born 24 October 1999) is an English footballer who plays as a right-back for Stoke City on loan from Chelsea.

Club career

Chelsea
Sterling joined Chelsea in 2007 at under-8 level and made his under-19 debut in a UEFA Youth League fixture against Sporting CP in December 2014. Although, recently Sterling has been deployed as a wing-back, he has also been played as a winger or centre-forward and impressed during Chelsea's 2015–16 FA Youth Cup campaign, netting in both the semi-final and final. Following an impressive campaign, Sterling was promoted to the U23 squad for the 2016–17 season as a 16-year-old and became a key figure, featuring twenty-four times and scoring four goals. In October 2016, Sterling signed his first professional contract upon his 17th birthday.

On 20 September 2017, Sterling made his Chelsea debut during their EFL Cup third round tie against Nottingham Forest, replacing Davide Zappacosta for the final 14 minutes of the 5–1 victory at Stamford Bridge.

Loan to Coventry City
On 27 June 2018, it was agreed that Sterling would join newly promoted League One side Coventry City on a season-long loan.

Loan to Wigan Athletic
On 1 August 2019, Sterling joined Championship side Wigan Athletic on a season-long loan deal.

Loan to Blackpool
On 31 August 2021, Sterling returned to the Championship with Blackpool on a season-long loan deal after he signed a two-year contract extension with Chelsea. He competed with Jordan Gabriel for the right-back berth, covered at left-back when injuries dictated, and made up part of a back three on occasion. He made 25 appearances for Blackpool in all competitions.

He damaged his ankle ligaments in a match in early April 2022 and returned to Chelsea for treatment. His loan was kept active, however. At the end of the season, he posted on Twitter: "Big thanks to all the players, gaffer, coaches and staff for making my time at the club so positive." Chelsea manager Thomas Tuchel was reportedly impressed with Sterling's season, and informed him to prepare for the pre-season schedule.

Loan to Stoke City
On 1 September 2022, Sterling joined Stoke City on loan for the 2022–23 season.

International career
Sterling was born in England to Jamaican parents. Sterling has represented England from under-16 to under-20 level. He represented England Under-17 at the 2016 U-17 Euros and was included in the team of the tournament.

In September 2016, Sterling made his debut for the England Under-19 team in a 1–1 draw against the Netherlands. In June 2017 he was selected to represent England at the 2017 UEFA European Under-19 Championship. Despite Sterling scoring an own goal, England went on to defeat Portugal 2–1 in the final. He was subsequently named in the team of the tournament.

Career statistics

Honours

Club
 Chelsea Reserves
 FA Youth Cup: 2015–16, 2016–17
 UEFA Youth League: 2014–15, 2015–16
 U18 Premier League: 2016–17

International
England U19
UEFA European Under-19 Championship: 2017

Individual
 UEFA European Under-17 Championship Team of the Tournament: 2016
 UEFA European Under-19 Championship Team of the Tournament: 2017

References

External links

England profile at The Football Association

1999 births
Living people
Footballers from Islington (district)
English footballers
England youth international footballers
Association football defenders
Chelsea F.C. players
Coventry City F.C. players
Wigan Athletic F.C. players
Blackpool F.C. players
Stoke City F.C. players
English Football League players
Black British sportspeople
English people of Jamaican descent